Gizem Gönültaş (born July 13, 1993) is a Turkish women's football forward currently playing in the Turkish Women's First League for Beşiktaş J.K. with jersey number 10. She played in the national teams of Turkish girls' U-17, women's U-19, women's U-21 and lately in the Turkey women's team.

Early life 
Gizem Gönültaş was born to a blind mother Atiye Gönültaş in Ordu, Turkey on July 13, 1993. She has an older brother and a younger sister, İrem, who is also a footballer. Both sisters are supported by their mother in sports.

She is a student of physical education and sports at Marmara University to become a teacher.

Club career 
She began football playing already in the primary school. After the formation of a girls' football team Soyaspor, Gönültaş began her sports career.

Gizem Gönültaş received her license on May 9, 2007, for her hometown club Soyaspor, where she played in the Women's Second League during the 2008–09 season. After two more seasons with Soyaspor in the Turkish Women's Regional League, she transferred to Orduspor to play in the Second League. In the 2012–13 season, she moved to Çamlıcaspor, which played in the Women's First League. After one season, she became part of Adana İdmanyurduspor.

In the second half of the 2014–15 season, she was transferred by the newly established women's football side of Beşiktaş J.K., which started in the Turkish Women's Third League. Scoring 21 goals in 10 appearances, she played an important role for her team's promotion to the Women's Second League for the 2015–16 season. Following her team's promotion, she played in the 2016–17 Turkish Women's First Football League. She enjoyed the champion title of her team in the 2018-19 season. She took part at the 2019–20 UEFA Women's Champions League - Group 9 matches. Following her team^s champion title of the 2020-21 Turkcell League,  she played in two matches of the 2021–22 UEFA Women's Champions League qualifying rounds.

International career 
Gönültaş was admitted to the Turkey girls' U-17 team, and debuted in the 2009 UEFA Women's Under-17 Championship – Group 5 match against the Netherlands on October 20, 2008. She took part at the 2010 UEFA Women's Under-17 Championship – Group 4 matches. She capped in 15 matches in total and scored four goals.

She played her first match with the Turkey women's U-19 team on August 15, 2009, against Moldova. Gönültaş played in the 2010 UEFA Women's U-19 Championship First qualifying round – Group 7, 2010 UEFA Women's U-19 Championship Second qualifying round – Group 1, 2011 UEFA Women's U-19 Championship First qualifying round – Group 9 and 2011 UEFA Women's U-19 Championship Second qualifying round – Group 3 matches. She capped 33 times for the women's U-19 team.

Gönültaş was also part of the Turkey women's U-21, and the Turkey women's teams.

Career statistics 
.

Honours 
Turkish Women's First League
Beşiktaş J.K.
 Winners (2): 2018–19, 2020–21
 Runners-up (2): 2016–17, 2017–18

Turkish Women's Second League
Beşiktaş J.K.
 Winners (1): 2015–16

Turkish Women's Third League
Beşiktaş J.K.
 Winners (1): 2014–15

References

External links 

1993 births
Living people
Sportspeople from Ordu
Turkish women's footballers
Women's association football forwards
Marmara University alumni
Adana İdmanyurduspor players
Beşiktaş J.K. women's football players
Turkish Women's Football Super League players
21st-century Turkish women